The 2015 FIA European Truck Racing Championship was a motor-racing championship using highly tuned tractor units. It was the 31st year of the championship and Norbert Kiss won the title for the second year in a row with MAN.

Teams and drivers

Race drivers without fixed number, whose number is defined race by race:

Calendar and winners

Championship Overall Standings

Drivers' Championship

Each round or racing event consisted of four races. At each race, the points awarded according to the ranking was on a 20, 15, 12, 10, 8, 6, 4, 3, 2, 1 basis to the top 10 finishers.

† – Drivers did not finish the race, but were classified as they completed over 75% of the race distance.

Source of information:
and

References

External links 

Truck Race Organization
TruckRacing.de 
Race and championship results as table sheets

European Truck Racing Championship seasons
European Truck Racing Championship
Truck Racing Championship